Arnot station is a flag stop railway station in Arnot, Manitoba, Canada.  The stop is served by Via Rail's Winnipeg – Churchill train.

Footnotes 

Via Rail stations in Manitoba